Sekirnik is a village in the municipality of Bosilovo, North Macedonia.

Demographics
According to the 2002 census, the village had a total of 1,194 inhabitants. Ethnic groups in the village include:

Macedonians 1,193
Others 1

References

Villages in Bosilovo Municipality